I Hear You Rockin’  is a live album released by The Dave Edmunds Band in 1986 on Columbia LP record 40603.

Background
This “live” album was tweaked in the studio by Edmunds, who is known for his production perfectionism.  It was to be his last solo effort for Columbia, and mostly features songs already associated with Edmunds.  Two songs were previously un-recorded by him, “Paralyzed” and “The Wanderer.”

Reception
This album entered the Billboard 200 album charts on January 31, 1987 and remained on the charts for twelve weeks, peaking at position #106. The album has been reviewed as “energetic,” “enjoyable,” and “excellent.”

Track listing 
 "Girls Talk" (Elvis Costello)
 "Here Comes The Weekend"  (Dave Edmunds)
 "Queen of Hearts" (Hank DeVito)
 "Paralyzed" (Otis Blackwell, Elvis Presley)
 "The Wanderer" (Ernie Maresca)
 "Crawling from the Wreckage" (Graham Parker)
 "Slipping Away" (Jeff Lynne)
 "Information" (Dave Edmunds, Mark Radice)
 "I Hear You Knocking" (Dave Bartholomew, Pearl King)
 "I Knew the Bride (When She Used to Rock and Roll)" (Nick Lowe)
 "Ju Ju Man" (Jim Ford, Lolly Vegas)

Personnel
 Dave Charles - drums
 John David – bass guitar, vocals
 Dave Edmunds – guitar, vocals
 Mickey Gee - guitar
 Geraint Watkins – keyboards, vocals

References

1986 live albums
Columbia Records live albums
Live rockabilly albums
Dave Edmunds albums
Albums produced by Dave Edmunds